Anna Prucnal (born 17 December 1940) is a Polish actress in both cinema and theatre, as well as a singer.

Prucnal was born in Warsaw, Poland. After her father, a surgeon, was killed by the Nazis during World War II, Anna and her sister were raised by their mother, who was of noble descent and related to the 18th-century King of Poland Stanisław Leszczyński. After studying piano and lyrical song, Anna Prucnal went on an acting career at the Studencki Teatr Satyryków, in Warsaw.

Prucnal first appeared in a movie at the age of twenty-two in the film “Sun and Shadow” (Slăntzeto i siankata), a popular release. In 1970, Prucnal moved to France and embarked upon a theatrical career, appearing in a number of plays by Bertolt Brecht. She worked with many important directors including Jorge Lavelli, Georges Wilson, Roger Planchon, Jean-Louis Barrault, Marc’O, Petrika Ionesco, Lucian Pintilie and Jacques Lassalle. She also appeared in several notable films, the most notorious of which was Dusan Makavejev's “Sweet Movie”, which Polish authorities deemed to be pornographic and anticommunist. As a result, Anna was banned from using her Polish passport, effectively exiling her from her homeland.
 
During the 1970s, Anna developed her career as a singer. Her album “Dream of West, Dream of East” was popular, initially in France, then Belgium, worldwide and, finally, in Warsaw in 1989, as part of the celebration of the bicentenary of the French Revolution, and representing a homecoming of sorts for Anna.

Prucnal has continued to release records (such as “Monsieur Brecht” in 2006), and act in movies (“Wimbledon Stage” in 2001) and TV, as well as appearing on stage in the acclaimed play “The Vagina Monologues” in 2005.

In 2002, Prucnal published her autobiography (not yet translated in English) entitled “Moi qui suis née à Varsovie” (“I, who was born in Warsaw”), co-authored with Jean Mailland.

Filmography 
 1962 : Sun and Shadow (Original title: Слънцето и сянката or  Slăntzeto i siankata)
 1963 : Teenager (Original title: Smarkula)
 1963 : New year eve adventure (Original title: Przygoda noworoczna)
 1964 : The Flying Dutchman (Original title: Le Hollandais volant)
 1966 : Reise ins Ehebett
 1970 : Nowy
 1970 : Unterwegs zu Lenin
 1970 : Der Sekretär
 1972 : Hellé
 1974 : Sweet Movie
 1976 : Dracula père et fils
 1976 : Guerres civiles en France - premier empire - La semaine sanglante
 1978 : Le Dossier 51
 1979 : Bastien, Bastienne
 1979 : Mais où et donc Ornicar
 1980 : La città delle donne
 1981 : Neige
 1981 : L'Ogre de barbarie
 1983 : L'Homme qui aimait deux femmes
 1989 : Un amour tardif
 1993 : Lepiej być piękną i bogatą (Better to be pretty and rich)
 1993 : Au port de la lune
 1994 : Crows (Wrony)
 1997 : C'est la tangente que je préfère
 2002 : Le Stade de Wimbledon
 2005 : Slogans pour 343 actrices

Discography 
 1967 : Letkiss-Boy
 1967 : Träume sind so wunderschön
 1979 : Félicité
 1979 : L'Été
 1980 : Théâtre de la ville
 1981 : Avec Amour
 1982 : Loin de Pologne
 1984 : L'âge de cœur
 1987 : Rêve d'ouest, rêve d'est
 1987 : Ivre vive - Luna moon
 1988 : Concert 88
 1993 : Monsieur Brecht
 1993 : C'était à Babelsberg
 1995 : Dédicaces
 1995 : L'intégrale
 1996 : Rêve d'Ouest - Rêve d'Est
 1998 : Anna Prucnal chante Vertynski
 1999 : Les années fatales
 2001 : Le Cirque de Giuseppe
 2002 : Je vous aime
 2006 : Monsieur Brecht
 2006 : Rêve d'ouest - Rêve d'est

Television 
 1968 : Przekładaniec, by Andrzej Wajda
 1968 : Wege übers Land, by Martin Eckermann
 1974 : The Festival with Spitz, by Edouard Luntz
 1974 : A Young Man Alone, by Jean Mailland
 1976 : Nick Verlaine or How to steal the Tower Eiffel, by Claude Boissol
 1979 : Quincailler of Meaux, by Pierre Lary
 1981 : War in neutral country, by Philippe Lefèbvre
 1982 : Anna Prucnal, dream of west-dream of east, by Jean Mailland
 1982 : The Ogre of cruelty, Pierre Matteuzzi
 1986 : The Laughter of Caïn, Marcel Moussy
 1988 : Toâ realized, by Yves-André Hubert
 1988 : A madness, by Alain Dhenault
 1989 : Anna Prucnal, until new order, by Jean Mailland
 1990 : Silesia, letter with two votes, by Jean Mailland

Theatre 
 1971 : Small Mahagonny, Bertolt Brecht
 1971 : The Parisian life, Jacques Offenbach
 1972 : Seven deadly sins, Bertolt Brecht and Kurt Weill
 1972 : Gave Mobil, Claude Prey
 1973 : Rock bottom, Marc’ O
 1973 : The Four binoculars, Copi
 1974 : Ubu with the opera, Alfred Jarry
 1975 : A.A. theaters of Adamov, Roger Planchon
 1975 : Middle-class Madnesses, Roger Planchon
 1975 : The Man occis, Claude Prey
 1975 : Nights of Paris
 1976 : The French Grandmother, by Eugène Ionesco'
 1977 : Jacques or the tender and the future in the eggs, by Eugène Ionesco'
 1977 : Domestic industry, F.K. Kroetz, Jacques Lassalle
 1978 : Remagen, Anna Seghers, by Jacques Lassalle
 1978 : Kabaret, Jean Mailland
 1984 : The Beautiful Helene, Jacques Offenbach
 1984 : The human Voice, Jean Cocteau and Francis Poulenc
 1986 : Ghetto, Josual Sobol
 1987 : Connected, Eugene O’ Neill
 1988 : Awakes Philadelphia, François Billetdoux
 1990 : The Opera of quat’ under, Bertolt Brecht and Kurt Weill
 1991 : The Room, Wilhelm de Tove Ditlevsen
 1992 : Mr Brecht, according to Bertolt Brecht
 1993 : The human Voice, Jean Cocteau and Francis Poulenc
 1994 : The following days which sing false, Josual Sobol
 1996 : Gernika 1937, a lyric review, of Jean Mailland'
 1999 : The Circus of Giuseppe, Jean-Louis Bauer and Piotr Moss
 2000 : Song of the swan and other stories, Anton Tchekhov'
 2002 : The Foreigner of the city, Bernard Martin
 2003 : Red Evil and gold, Jean Cocteau
 2004 : Anna Prucnal and Jean Cocteau
 2005 : The Vagina Monologues, by Eve Ensler

External links

Official Webpage

1940 births
Living people
Musicians from Warsaw
Polish actresses
Polish exiles
Polish women singers
Polish film actresses
Polish stage actresses
Polish emigrants to France